The 2022 Pan American Gymnastics Championships was held in Rio de Janeiro, Brazil starting in June 2022.  Three gymnastics disciplines were contested: artistic gymnastics (from July 15–17), rhythmic gymnastics (from July 7–10), and trampoline (from June 26–28).

Medalists

Artistic gymnastics

Senior

Junior

Rhythmic gymnastics

Senior

Junior

Trampoline gymnastics

Senior

Junior

Medal table

Overall

Artistic

Men

Women

Rhythmic

Trampoline

World Championships qualification

Artistic 
This event served as qualification for the 2022 World Championships in Liverpool.  The top four men's teams and top five women's teams during the qualification round qualified a team to the World Championships.  For the men this was the United States, Brazil, Canada and Colombia; for the women this was Brazil, the United States, Canada, Argentina, and Mexico.

The top 6 men and top 11 women not part of a qualified team qualified as an individual to the World Championships (max two athletes per gender per country).  For the men the individual qualifiers were Santiago Mayol (Argentina), Edward Gonzales (Peru), Jose Lopez (Puerto Rico), Isaac Nuñez (Mexico), Leandro Peña (Dominican Republic), and Joel Álvarez (Chile).  The women who qualified were Tyesha Mattis (Jamaica), Valentina Pardo (Colombia), Ana Karina Mendez (Peru), Antonia Marihuan (Chile), Ginna Escobar (Colombia), Milca Leon (Venezuela), Franchesca Santi (Chile), Alais Perea (Ecuador), Annalise Newman-Achee (Trinidad and Tobago), Franciny Morales (Costa Rica), and Karla Navas (Panama).

References 

Pan American Gymnastics
Pan American Gymnastics Championships
International gymnastics competitions hosted by Brazil
Pan American Gymnastics Championships
Pan American Gymnastics Championships
Pan American Gymnastics Championships